Nationality words link to articles with information on the nation's poetry or literature (for instance, Irish or France).

Events

Works published

Births
Death years link to the corresponding "[year] in poetry" article. There are conflicting or unreliable sources for the birth years of many people born in this period; where sources conflict, the poet is listed again and the conflict is noted:

1050:
 Baldric of Dol (died 1130), abbot who wrote epitaphs, riddles, epistolary, and long form poems

1055:
 Fujiwara no Akisue (died 1123), Japanese poet and nobleman

1057:
 Minamoto no Shunrai (died 1129), Japanese poet

1058
Ibn Khafajah, (died 1138 or 1139) Arabic-language poet in Al-Andalus (Spain)

Deaths
Birth years link to the corresponding "[year] in poetry" article:

1050:
 Baba Kuhi, Persian Sufi poet

1053:
 Liu Yong (born 987), Song poet

1056:
 Samuel ibn Naghrela (born 993), Hebrew poet in Al-Andalus

1057:
 Al-Ma'arri (born 973), blind Arab philosopher, poet and writer

1058:
 Solomon ibn Gabirol (born 1021), Hebrew poet in Al-Andalus

See also

 Poetry
 11th century in poetry
 11th century in literature
 List of years in poetry

Other events:
 Other events of the 12th century
 Other events of the 13th century

11th century:
 11th century in poetry
 11th century in literature

Notes

11th-century poetry
Poetry